The Nordica 16 is a Canadian trailerable sailboat, based on the Lynaes 14, a 1820 design by Swede Ole Jensen.

Production
The boat was built by Exe Fibercraft in Canada starting in 1975, with 400 examples completed, but it is now out of production.

Design

The Nordica 16 is a small recreational keelboat, built predominantly of fiberglass, with wood trim. It has a fractional sloop rig, a transom-hung rudder and a fixed long keel. It displaces  and carries  of ballast.

The boat is normally fitted with a small outboard motor for docking and maneuvering.

The boat has a PHRF racing average handicap of 390.

See also
List of sailing boat types

Similar sailboats
Balboa 16
Catalina 16.5
COM-PAC 19
Cornish Shrimper 19
DS-16
Edel 540
Halman 20
Hunter 20
Laguna 16
Leeward 16
Martin 16
Mercury 18
Sanibel 17
Sirocco 15
Watkins 17

References

External links

Keelboats
1820s sailboat type designs
Sailing yachts
Trailer sailers
Sailboat type designs by Ole Jensen
Sailboat types built by Exe Fibercraft